"Entre el Amor y los Halagos" (English: "Between Love and Flattery") is the third single from Ricky Martin's second solo album Me Amaras. It was released on January 4, 1994.

The song reached number twelve on the Hot Latin Songs in the United States.

Formats and track listings
Latin America promotional CD single
"Entre el Amor y los Halagos" – 4:17

Brazilian promotional 12" single
"Entre o Amor e o Carinho (Entre el Amor y los Halagos)" – 4:17

Charts

References

1994 singles
Ricky Martin songs
Spanish-language songs
Pop ballads
Songs written by Juan Carlos Calderón
Sony Discos singles
1993 songs